Charged multivesicular body protein 3 is a protein that in humans is encoded by the VPS24 gene.

Function 
This gene encodes a protein that acts in the sorting of transmembrane proteins into lysosomes/vacuoles via the multivesicular body (MVB) pathway. This protein, along with other soluble coiled-coil containing proteins, forms part of the ESCRT-III protein complex that binds to the endosomal membrane and recruits additional cofactors for protein sorting into the MVB. This protein may also co-immunoprecipitate with a member of the IFG-binding protein superfamily. Alternative splicing results in multiple transcript variants encoding different isoforms.

Interactions 
VPS24 has been shown to interact with IGFBP7.

References

Further reading